The David di Donatello Award for Best Producer (Italian: David di Donatello per il miglior produttore) is a film award presented annually by the Accademia del Cinema Italiano (ACI, Academy of Italian Cinema) to recognize outstanding production efforts by producers or production companies who have worked within the Italian film industry during the year preceding the ceremony.

The award was first given in 1956 and became competitive in 1981.

Winners and nominees
Below, winners are listed first in the colored row, followed by other nominees.

1950s

1960s

1970s

1980s

1990s

2000s

2010s

See also
 Nastro d'Argento for Best Producer
 Cinema of Italy

References

External links
 
 Daviddidonatello.it (official website)

David di Donatello